Ascension Guerra Gonzalez (born 28 February 1955 in Madrid) is a Spanish archer.

Archery

She took part in three World Archery Championships and had a highest finish of 58th.

At the 1984 Summer Olympic Games she came 38th with 2304 points scored in the women's individual event.

References

External links 
 Profile on worldarchery.org

1955 births
Living people
Spanish female archers
Olympic archers of Spain
Archers at the 1984 Summer Olympics
Sportspeople from Madrid